Oskar Karl Johann Liigand (24 May 1874 Karksi Parish (now Mulgi Parish), Kreis Pernau – 20 November 1940 Tõdva Parish, Harju County) was an Estonian journalist and politician. He was a member of the I, II, III and IV Riigikogu.

1926-1929 he was First Assistant Secretary of III Riigikogu.

References

1874 births
1940 deaths
People from Mulgi Parish
People from Kreis Pernau
Estonian People's Party politicians
National Centre Party (Estonia) politicians
Members of the Riigikogu, 1920–1923
Members of the Riigikogu, 1923–1926
Members of the Riigikogu, 1926–1929
Members of the Riigikogu, 1929–1932